Binky may refer to:

Characters
 Binky (Harry Potter), Lavender Brown's rabbit in the Harry Potter series
 Binky (Discworld), Death's horse in the Discworld book series
 Binky (Life in Hell), the main character of the Life in Hell comic strip series by Matt Groening
 Binky Biggs, the title character of the DC Comics series Leave It to Binky
 Binky the Clown, a minor character in the comic strip Garfield
 Binky Barnes, an anthropomorphic bulldog in Arthur, a children's book and animated television series

People
 Binky Favis, Filipino basketball coach in the 1990s and 2000s
 Alexandra "Binky" Felstead, in the British structured-reality television series Made in Chelsea
 Binky Jones (1899–1961), American baseball player
 Binky Mack, an American rapper from the group Allfrumtha I

Other uses
 Binky (polar bear), a bear formerly in an Alaskan zoo
 Pacifier

See also
 Binkie (disambiguation)

Lists of people by nickname